Parectatina signata is a species of beetle in the family Cerambycidae, and the only species in the genus Parectatina. It was described by Gahan in 1907.

References

Desmiphorini
Beetles described in 1907
Monotypic beetle genera